Anthonie Johannes Gronum (born 15 June 1985) is a South African rugby union player, currently playing with Border club side Old Selbornians. His regular position is lock.

Career

References

South African rugby union players
Living people
1985 births
People from Knysna
Blue Bulls players
Leopards (rugby union) players
Border Bulldogs players
Rugby union locks
Rugby union players from the Western Cape